Digambar Bapuji Pawar Patil (born 1 February 1952) is an Indian politician who was the Member of Parliament in the Lok Sabha of India. He represented Nanded constituency of Maharashtra and is a member of the Bharatiya Janata Party (BJP) political party.
He unsuccessfully contested from Nanded in 2014 General elections against Ashok Chavan of Congress.

External links
 Official biographical sketch in Parliament of India website

Living people
1952 births
Bharatiya Janata Party politicians from Maharashtra
People from Maharashtra
India MPs 2004–2009
National Democratic Alliance candidates in the 2014 Indian general election
People from Marathwada
Lok Sabha members from Maharashtra
Marathi politicians